Joanna Wang  is a Taiwanese-American singer-songwriter, daughter of music producer  (王治平). Born in Taipei but raised in Los Angeles, California, Wang dropped out from Gabrielino High School when she was 16. Her debut album, Start from Here, was released in January 2008 as a double-disc set, one in English and the other in Chinese. The album reached No.1 in Taiwan and has been popular throughout Southeast Asia. In June 2008, it was released in Japan. Her second album, Joanna & Wang Ruo-lin, which includes her all-original endeavor, The Adult Storybook, was released in January 2009.

Career 
As she was raised in the United States, Wang was exposed to many pop music acts, including The Beatles, Queen, and Oingo Boingo. Among her major influences are Danny Elfman, Yoeko Kurahashi, Paul McCartney, and video game music, most notably those from the Castlevania, Zelda, and Mario series. She has stated in her YouTube videos and in interviews that she dislikes her debut and rejects it as her own work.

Wang is a left-handed guitarist.

She has performed some of her own work and has covered various popular songs in English and in Chinese on Taiwanese television programs.

Starting in 2013, Joanna began occasionally performing with a band under the name Alferd Packer & The Weird Uncles.

In March 2016, Joanna performed in a production of the musical Turn Left, Turn Right, based on the illustrated book of the same name, sometimes known as A Chance of Sunshine in English.

Wang's rendition of Pure Imagination from her album Midnight Cinema was used for the Samsung Galaxy Fold product unveiling advertisement in February 2019.

Awards 

2008: Singapore Hit Awards 2008 – Outstanding Newcomer
2008: 9th CCTV-MTV Music Awards – Most Popular New Female Artist of the Year in Hong Kong and Taiwan
2008: Metro Hits Music Awards – Metroshowbiz Hits Mandarin Songwriter Singer Big Award
2008: Metro Hits Music Awards – Metro Radio Hits Most Voted Newcomer Award
2008: China Mobile Wireless Music Awards – Most Potential New Female Singer
2008: 2008 Beijing Chinese Pop Music Awards – Best Composer-Singer Newcomer

Discography

Albums 
Start from Here (2008)
Joanna & Wang Ruo-lin (2009)
The Adult Storybook (2009)
The Things We Do for Love (2011)
The Adventures of Bernie the Schoolboy (2011)
Galaxy Crisis: The Strangest Midnight Broadcast (2013)
Midnight Cinema (2014)
Bob Music (2015)
House of Bullies (2016)
Modern Tragedy (2018)
Love is Calling Me (2019)

EP 
H.A.M. (Happy Accessible Music) (2016)

Notes

 a. Quotation in Chinese: "有壓力的話我也寧可這樣，我想做自己想要的音樂。"

References

Further reading
"Taiwan New Jazz Star Starts from Beijing", China Radio International, 2008-04-08.
Brownlow, Ron. "Step into the spotlight", Taipei Times, 2006-12-08.

External links

Joanna Wang official website
Joanna YouTube Channel
New Tokyo Terror YouTube Channel
Joanna Hong Kong Fans Forum

1988 births
Living people
Musicians from Taipei
Musicians from Los Angeles
Taiwanese emigrants to the United States
Taiwanese women singers
Taiwanese singer-songwriters
People from Miaoli County
Taiwanese people of Hakka descent
American people of Chinese descent